Nicholas Henry Charles Cooper (born 14 October 1953) is a former English cricketer. Cooper was a left-handed batsman who bowled right-arm off break. He was born in Bristol. He currently works at Westcliff High School for Boys.

Cooper made his first-class debut for Gloucestershire against Yorkshire in the 1975 County Championship. He made sixteen further first-class appearances for the county, the last of which came against Worcestershire in the 1978 County Championship. In his seventeen first-class matches for the county, he scored 561 runs at an average of 18.80, with a high score of 106. His only century came against Oxford University in 1976. He made his List A debut for the county against Essex in the 1975 John Player League. He made four further List A appearances for Gloucestershire, the last of which came against Minor Counties West. He struggled in limited-overs matches for the county, scoring just 27 runs at an average of 5.40, with a high score of 12.

In 1979 he undertook studies at the University of Cambridge, while there he played first-class cricket for Cambridge University Cricket Club, making his debut against Leicestershire. He made six further first-class appearances for the university in that season, the last of which came against Oxford University. In his seven first-class appearances for the university, he scored 264 runs at an average of 37.71, with a highest score of 54. He also took 6 wickets for the university, which came at a bowling average of 36.00, with best figures of 2/11. He also played List A cricket for the Combined Universities in the 1979 Benson & Hedges Cup, making four appearances. Again he struggled in the limited-overs format, scoring 58 runs at an average of 14.50, with a highest score of 37. He did though take his only wickets in that format for the Combined Universities.
After leaving first class cricket Cooper played for many years at Westcliff Cricket Club, Where he was a key part in one of the best sides in the club's illustrious history.

Cooper is currently teaching geology at Westcliff High School for Boys, where he has been working for over 40 years. His experience has led him to be one of the two department heads in the geography and geology department. Naturally he takes his place as 'Head of Geology'.

References

External links
Nicholas Cooper at ESPNcricinfo
Nicholas Cooper at CricketArchive

1953 births
Living people
Cricketers from Bristol
English cricketers
Gloucestershire cricketers
Alumni of the University of Cambridge
Cambridge University cricketers
British Universities cricketers
Hertfordshire cricketers